Northampton High School may refer to the following schools:

Northampton High School, England, Northamptonshire
Northampton High School (Massachusetts), United States
Northampton Area High School, Pennsylvania, United States
Northampton County High School, North Carolina, United States, see North Carolina High School Athletic Association#1A

See also 
Northampton School for Boys, Northamptonshire, England
Northampton School for Girls, Northamptonshire, England